Fudbalski klub Sarajevo is a Bosnian professional football club based in Sarajevo, the capital city of Bosnia and Herzegovina, and is one of the most successful clubs in the country.

This list includes major honours won by FK Sarajevo, records set by the club, its managers and players. The player records section includes details of the club's leading goalscorers and players with the most appearances in first-team competitions.

The club's record appearance maker is Ibrahim Biogradlić, who made 646 appearances between 1951 and 1967. Dobrivoje Živkov is the club's record goalscorer, scoring 212 goals in all competitions (official and unofficial) during his career in FK Sarajevo. The club's top goalscorer in official matches is legendary striker Asim Ferhatović, who found the back of the net on 100 separate occasions (198 in total).

Honours

Yugoslavia
Yugoslav First League:
Winners (2): 1966–67, 1984–85
Runners-up (2): 1964–65, 1979–80
Yugoslav Cup:
 Runners-up (2): 1966–67, 1982–83

Bosnia and Herzegovina
Premier League of Bosnia and Herzegovina:
Winners (5): 1998–1999, 2006–07, 2014–15, 2018–19, 2019–20
 Runners-up (7): 1994–1995, 1996–1997, 1997–1998, 2005–06, 2010–11, 2012–13, 2020–21
Bosnia and Herzegovina Football Cup:
Winners (7): 1996–1997, 1997–1998, 2001–02, 2004–05, 2013–14, 2018–19, 2020–21
 Runners-up (4): 1998–1999, 2000–01, 2016–17, 2021–22
Supercup of Bosnia and Herzegovina:
Winners (1): 1997
Runners-up (2): 1998, 1999

Doubles
Premier League and National Cup: 2018–19

Player records

Most appearances

Top goalscorers - All matches
The following is a list of FK Sarajevo top goalscorers in both official and unofficial matches

Top goalscorers - Official matches
The following is a list of FK Sarajevo top goalscorers in official matches

Season by season
Season by Season statistics from the club's foundation to the present.

Games

Goals

Individual awards

Domestic

Yugoslav First League top scorers 

Premier League of Bosnia and Herzegovina top scorers

Yugoslav Footballer of the Year  
 Safet Sušić (1979, 1980)

Premier League of Bosnia and Herzegovina player of the year  
 Emir Hadžić (2012), Mersudin Ahmetović (2019)

Young Footballer of the Year in Bosnia and Herzegovina 
 Haris Handžić (2009), Nihad Mujakić (2019)

Premier League of Bosnia and Herzegovina goalkeeper of the year 
 Muhamed Alaim (2009), Vladan Kovačević (2019)

Sportske novosti Yellow Shirt award 
 Safet Sušić (1979)
 Predrag Pašić (1985)

International

UEFA Euro 1968 team of the tournament
 Mirsad Fazlagić (1968)

Bosnia and Herzegovina's UEFA Golden Jubilee inductee
 Safet Sušić

Bosnia and Herzegovina managers  
 Fuad Muzurović (1995–1997)
 Džemaludin Mušović (1998–1999)
 Faruk Hadžibegić (1999)
 Fuad Muzurović (2006–2007)
 Meho Kodro (2008)
 Denijal Pirić (2008)
 Miroslav Blažević (2008–2009)
 Safet Sušić (2009–2014)

Other national team managers
  Vojin Božović (1964–1965) – Libya 
  Abdulah Gegić (1969–1970) – Turkey 
  Miroslav Blažević (1976–1977) – Switzerland 
  Boško Antić (1987–1988) – Togo 
  Džemaludin Mušović (1990–1995) – Qatar 
  Miroslav Blažević (1994–2000) – Croatia 
  Miroslav Blažević (2001) – Iran 
  Džemaludin Mušović (2004–2007) – Qatar 
  Vladimir Petković (2014–present) – Switzerland

Players who have played for the national team in international competitions

Name            National team   Appearances

Faruk Hadžibegić – Yugoslavia     – 61 ap.
Predrag Pašić – Yugoslavia        – 11 ap.
Mirsad Fazlagić – Yugoslavia      – 19 ap.
Davor Jozić – Yugoslavia          – 27 ap.
Safet Sušić – Yugoslavia ; Bosnia & Herzegovina – 54 & 2 ap.
Boško Antić – Yugoslavia          – 1 ap.
Milenko Bajić – Yugoslavia        – 1 ap.
Srebrenko Repčić – Yugoslavia     – 1 ap.
Ibrahim Biogradlić – Yugoslavia   – 1 ap.
Lev Mantula – Yugoslavia          – 1 ap.
Zijad Švrakić – Yugoslavia        – 4 ap.
Mirza Kapetanović – Yugoslavia    – 6 ap.
Zijad Arslanagić – Yugoslavia     – 1 ap.
Džemal Berberović – Bosnia & Herzegovina – 33 ap.
Safet Nadarević – Bosnia & Herzegovina – 30 ap.
Mirza Varešanović – Bosnia & Herzegovina – 11 ap. 
Alen Škoro – Bosnia & Herzegovina – 4 ap.
Mirsad Dedić – Bosnia & Herzegovina – 32 ap.
Alen Avdić – Bosnia & Herzegovina – 3 ap.
Senad Repuh – Bosnia & Herzegovina – 14 ap.
Emir Granov – Bosnia & Herzegovina – 7 ap.
Edin Prljača – Bosnia & Herzegovina – 4 ap.
Emir Obuća – Bosnia & Herzegovina – 2 ap.
Sead Kapetanović – Bosnia & Herzegovina – 15 ap.
Samir Duro – Bosnia & Herzegovina – 7 ap.
Haris Handžić – Bosnia & Herzegovina – 2 ap.
Faruk Ihtijarević – Bosnia & Herzegovina – 11 ap.
Džemo Smječanin – Bosnia & Herzegovina – 1 ap.
Ivan Sesar – Bosnia & Herzegovina – 2 ap.
Admir Raščić – Bosnia & Herzegovina – 2 ap.
Ninoslav Milenković – Bosnia & Herzegovina – 15 ap.
Semjon Milošević – Bosnia & Herzegovina – 1 ap.
Gojko Cimirot – Bosnia & Herzegovina –  2 ap.
Adis Jahović – Macedonia          – 10 ap.
Krste Velkoski – Macedonia        –  7 ap.
Ahmad Kallasi – Syria –  5 ap.
Haris Duljević – Bosnia & Herzegovina –  5 ap.
Mersudin Ahmetović – Bosnia & Herzegovina –  2 ap.
Almir Bekić – Bosnia & Herzegovina –  1 ap.

Managerial records
First manager: Josip Bulat, served from October 1946 to November 1947.
First foreign manager: László Fenyvesi, served from August to January 1958.
Longest-serving manager: Miroslav Brozović, served from September 1948 to June 1956 (8 years).
Shortest-serving non-interim manager: Ljupko Petrović, served from 8 April 2014 to 10 April 2014 (2 days).
Only player-manager in club history: Miroslav Brozović, 1948–49; 1950–51
Managers that won the title both as players and managers: Boško Antić (1967; 1985) and Husref Musemić (1985; 2007, 2019).
Most tenures as manager: Srboljub Markušević, (1969–1971; 1972–1973; 1981–1983) Fuad Muzurović, (1977–1981; 1991–1996; 2001–2002) (3) Husref Musemić, (2001; 2002–2003; 2005–2008; 2013; 2017–2019) (5)
Manager with most wins in one season: Boško Antić, 1984–85 (19)
Manager with fewest wins in one season: Slavko Zagorac, 1947–48 (2)
Manager with most appearances in European competitions: Husref Musemić, (22)

Record departures

Homegrown players in notable clubs

All-Time First Yugoslav League Table
Top 11 only:

MP = Matches played; W = Matches won; D = Matches drawn; L = Matches lost; GF = Goals for; GA = Goals against; GD = Goal difference; P = Points;HF = Highest finish

All time table of Premier League of Bosnia and Herzegovina
Counting only since the 2002–03 season, the season the league became a unified country-wide league.
As of the end of the 2020–21 season.
Teams in bold are part of the 2021–22 season. 

Ssn = Number of seasons; Pld = Matches played; W = Matches won; D = Matches drawn; L = Matches lost; GF = Goals for; GA = Goals against; GD = Goal difference; Pts = Points; HF = Highest finish

 
1 In the 2004–05 season, Borac Banja Luka were deducted 1 point (Slavija were awarded 3–0 vs Borac in week 11).
2 In the 2006–07 season, Zrinjski were deducted 1 point (Orašje were awarded 3–0 vs Zrinjski).
3 In the 2013–14 season, Slavija were deducted 3 points.
4 In the 2019–20 season, Čelik were deducted 3 points (Željezničar were awarded 3–0 vs Čelik).

Club records

Matches

Firsts
 First match: Torpedo 6–0 Bratstvo Travnik, 3 November 1946.
 First Yugoslav First League match: FK Sarajevo 2–2 Ponziana Trieste, Yugoslav First League, 25 August 1947.
 First Yugoslav Cup match: FK Sarajevo 3–1 Velež Mostar, Yugoslav Cup, 1st round, 4 November 1947. 
 First unofficial European match: FK Sarajevo 5–3 Olympic Charleroi, 14 February 1950.
 First official European match: FK Sarajevo 2–4 MTK Budapest, Mitropa Cup, first round, 18 July 1960.
 First Bosnian League match: FK Sarajevo 4–0 Turbina Jablanica, first round, 22 May 1994. 
 First Bosnian Cup match: FK Sarajevo 4–1 Radnički Goražde, first round, 10 April 1994.

Wins
 Record European win: 6–0 against Marsaxlokk F.C. in the UEFA Champions League, 21 July 2007. 
 Record league win: 13–0 against Neretva Metkovići, 28 October 1957. 
 Record Sarajevo derby win: 6–1, 10 October 1954. 
 Record Cup win:
 Most league wins in a season: 19 wins from 34 games (during the 1984–85 season). 
 Fewest league wins in a season: 2 wins from 18 games (during the 1947–48 season).

Defeats
 Record defeat: 0–8 loss to Atalanta in the UEFA Europa League, 2 August 2018. 
 Record defeat at the Asim Ferhatović Hase Stadium: 0–8 loss to Atalanta in the UEFA Europa League, 2 August 2018.
 Record-scoring defeat: 4–6 loss to Hajduk Split, 11 February 1959
 Record Cup defeat: 
 Most league defeats in a season: 17 in 34 games, during the 1989–90 season.
 Fewest defeats in a season: 5 in 34 games, during the 1984–85 season.

Points
 Most points in a season: 70 in 33 games, during the 2018–19 season.
 Two points for a win: 48 in 34 games, during the 1984–85 season.

Goals
 Most goals in a season: 83 in 30 games, during the 2003–04 season.
 Fewest goals in a season: 19 in 18 games, during the 1947–48 season.
 Top goal-scorer in a single game: Salih Šehović scored 6 goals against Neretva Metkovići (13–0 win), 28 October 1957.
 Youngest goal-scorer in an official game: Demirel Veladžić, against Slavija Sarajevo (3–1 win), 4 November 2015. He was 16 years, 5 months and 20 days old at the time.

References

External links
Official Website 
FK Sarajevo at Facebook
FK Sarajevo at Twitter
FK Sarajevo at UEFA
FKSinfo 

FK Sarajevo